Ichneumon insidiosus is a species belonging to the family Ichneumonidae subfamily Ichneumoninae. It was first described by Constantin Wesmael in 1844.

Subspecies
Subspecies include:
 Ichneumon insidiosus insidiosus Wesmael, 1844
 Ichneumon insidiosus malaisei Roman, 1927

Description

This parasitic wasp has a black head and thorax, most of the legs are yellowish, while the abdomen is reddish with a black tip.

Distribution
This species is present in most of Europe (Andorra; Austria; Azerbaijan; Belarus; Belgium; Bulgaria; China; Croatia;Czech Republic; Slovakia; Finland; France; Germany; Hungary; Iran; Ireland; Italy; Liechtenstein; Netherlands; Poland; Portugal; Romania; Russia; Spain; Sweden; Switzerland; United Kingdom; former Yugoslavia).

References

Ichneumoninae
Insects described in 1844
Hymenoptera of Europe